Selenophorus striatopunctatus is a species of ground beetle in the family Carabidae. It is found in the Caribbean, Central America, North America, and South America.

References

Further reading

 

Harpalinae
Beetles of Central America
Beetles of North America
Beetles of South America
Insects of the Caribbean
Articles created by Qbugbot
Beetles described in 1878